Charles J. and Clara B. Schmidt House is a historic home located in Jefferson City, Cole County, Missouri. It was built about 1897, and is a -story, three bay, Missouri-German Vernacular brick dwelling.  It has a gable roof and features a one-story wooden porch with turned posts.

It was listed on the National Register of Historic Places in 2003.

References

Houses on the National Register of Historic Places in Missouri
Houses completed in 1897
Buildings and structures in Jefferson City, Missouri
National Register of Historic Places in Cole County, Missouri